Alden is a populated place located in Weld County, Colorado, United States.

References

Geography of Weld County, Colorado